Butler's Golf Course is a public golf course founded in 1928 located just east of Elizabeth, Pennsylvania. There are two 18-hole courses at this facility, the Woodside and the Lakeside.

Beginnings to the 1960s
The site where the course stands now was originally an airport and a strawberry farm owned by John W. Butler. In 1925 the airport closed when a stunt pilot took Butler's daughter for a ride and did a loop-di-loop.

Soon, Butler hired some people who had knowledge about golf and built the original 18 holes which opened in 1928.  The original clubhouse was built in the 1930s, but was destroyed in a tornado on August 3, 1963.

The 1960s to the present
The clubhouse was rebuilt after the tornado, and the Butler house became a bed & breakfast inn for vacationing tourists. The Lakeside course opened in 1963 with nine holes. The original 18 holes were rebuilt and became known as the Woodside course upon completion of the Lakeside course. In 1996, the back nine holes of the Woodside course became known as the Vista course. Nine more holes were added to the Lakeside course in 2000, and the two courses are known as the Woodside and the Lakeside.

The course today
The course is now owned by the fourth generation of the Butler family.

Scorecard

Trivia
 Butler's was one of the first public courses in Pennsylvania.

References

External links
 Official website

Buildings and structures in Allegheny County, Pennsylvania
Golf clubs and courses in Pennsylvania
Tourist attractions in Allegheny County, Pennsylvania
1928 establishments in Pennsylvania